St Mark's Church is in Basford, Staffordshire, England.  It is an active Anglican parish church, in the deanery of Newcastle-under-Lyme, the archdeaconry of Stoke-on-Trent, and the diocese of Lichfield.

History

St Mark's was built in 1914–15, and designed by the Lancaster architects Austin and Paley.  At that time only the east end and three bays of the nave and aisles were completed; the west wall was intended to be temporary.  In 1928–29 the same practice added new vestries at a cost of £1,450.  The west wall was rebuilt, and the rest of the church was completed in 1971, by Charles R. Lewis.

See also
List of ecclesiastical works by Austin and Paley (1895–1916)
List of ecclesiastical works by Austin and Paley (1916–44)

References
Citations

Sources

Further reading

External links
Church website

20th-century Church of England church buildings
Church of England church buildings in Staffordshire
Gothic Revival church buildings in England
Gothic Revival architecture in Staffordshire
Austin and Paley buildings